Vaivaka is a village in Mudinepalli mandal in Krishna district in the Andhra Pradeshstate in India.

Demographics
 India census, Vaivaka had a population of 5000. Males constitute 50% of the population. Vaivaka has an average literacy rate of 60%.

References

Villages in Krishna district